Needhi Singh is a Punjabi language crime thriller women focused film directed by Jaivi Dhanda and produced by Inder Bhandaal and Sumeet Singh. The film is based on a true story about a village girl, Needhi Singh, who faces social estrangements and hardship. After which she goes takes revenge from all of the people that did wrong with her  The film was scheduled to be released on 22 July 2016.

The role of Needhi Singh is portrayed by Kulraj Randhawa. Upon the film's trailer release, it received mostly positive reviews.

Cast 
 Kulraj Randhawa
 Aman Sutdhar
 Ashish Duggal
 Raman Dhagga

Crew 
Chief Assistant Director
 Sahil Dev
2nd chief AD
 Raman Dhagga
DOP
 Vijay Choudhary and Sai Raaj
Editor
 Mukesh Thakur
Art Director
 Nitin Wable
Costume Designer
 Chetna Varmani
Assistant Directors
 Neha Sharma
 Puneet Raajpal
 Sahil Dua
 Jassi Kamiria
 Amandeep Slariya
Line Producer
 Gabbar Sangrur

References 

2016 films
Punjabi-language Indian films
2010s Punjabi-language films